Neredcherla mandal is one of the 23 mandals in Suryapet district of the Indian state of Telangana. It is under the administration of Suryapet revenue division with its headquarters at Neredcherla. It is bounded by Penpahad mandal towards North, Garidepally mandal towards East, Palakeedu mandal towards South, Nalgonda district towards West.

Geography
It is in the 91 m elevation(altitude) .

Demographics
Neredcherla mandal is having population of 41,047. Neredcherla is the largest and Kalvaldinne is the smallest village in the mandal.

Villages
 census of India, the mandal has 13 settlements. 
The settlements in the mandal are listed below:

Notes
(†) Mandal headquarter

References

Mandals in Suryapet district